Luen On San Tsuen is a village in Tuen Mun District, Hong Kong.

Administration
Luen On San Tsuen is one of the 36 villages represented within the Tuen Mun Rural Committee.

External links

 Delineation of area of existing village Luen On San Tsuen (Tuen Mun) for election of resident representative (2019 to 2022)

Villages in Tuen Mun District, Hong Kong